Put Yourself in His Place is a 1912 American silent short drama based on an 1870 English novel by Charles Reade. The film was adapted and directed by Theodore Marston, and stars William Garwood and Marguerite Snow in the lead roles.

Plot
The story is of an English manufacturing town {Huddersfield} in which Henry Little, a worker and inventor, is persecuted by trade unions, jealous because he was better trained than his fellows. Squire Raby, Little's uncle, is a forcible character, and a pleasant love story offsets the labor troubles. A purpose of the novel was to expose, without censure, the errors of early trades unions.

Cast
William Garwood as Henry Little
Marguerite Snow as Grace Carden
William Russell as Squire Raby
Jean Darnell as Edith Raby, the Squire's Sister
James Cruze as Edith's Husband
David H. Thompson as Coventry
Anne Drew as Jael Dence
Marie Eline

Notes

References

External links
Put Yourself in His Place at Google Books

1912 films
1912 drama films
Thanhouser Company films
Silent American drama films
American silent short films
American black-and-white films
Films directed by Theodore Marston
1912 short films
1910s American films